Queen's Pawn is a 1969 thriller novel by the British writer Victor Canning. The title is a reference to the chess opening of the same name and the fact that much of the novel's action centres around the Queen Elizabeth 2 ocean liner. It was his first novel after finishing the Rex Carver series of spy adventures.

Synopsis
Andrew Raikes a confidence trickster is trying to raise enough money to reclaim his family's ancestral home which had been lost by his father's mismanagement. Barely two months after achieving this he and his erstwhile partner are blackmailed into taking part in a heist on a cruise liner, and make great efforts to identify and eliminate the blackmailer.

References

Bibliography
 Murphy, Bruce F. The Encyclopedia of Murder and Mystery. Springer, 1999.
 Reilly, John M. Twentieth Century Crime & Mystery Writers. Springer, 2015.

External links 
 Full bibliography by John Higgins
 Publication details 
 The Victor Canning Pages

1969 British novels
British crime novels
British thriller novels
Novels by Victor Canning
Heinemann (publisher) books